Mellona or Mellonia was an ancient Roman goddess said by St. Augustine to promote the supply of honey (Latin mel, mellis) as Pomona did for apples and Bubona for cattle.   Arnobius describes her as "a goddess important and powerful regarding bees, taking care of and protecting the sweetness of honey."

W.H. Roscher includes Mellona among the indigitamenta, the list of deities maintained by Roman priests to assure that the correct divinity was invoked for rituals.

See also
 Ah-Muzen-Cab, Mayan god of bees
 Aristaeus, ancient Greek god of bees  
 Austėja, Lithuanian goddess of bees
 Bee (mythology)
 Bhramari, Hindu goddess of bees
 Bubilas, Lithuanian god of bees  
 Colel Cab, Mayan goddess of bees
 Melissa, ancient Greek/Minoan nymph/goddess of bees

References

Animal goddesses
Food deities
Roman goddesses